A  is a tube-sleeved, unisex Japanese robe worn by guests at traditional inns, hot spring resorts and spas.

See also

Kimono
Bathrobe

Japanese full-body garments
Robes and cloaks
Japanese words and phrases